A.D. Fornos de Algodres is a Portuguese football club from the municipality of Fornos de Algodres in the Guarda District. It was founded on 1970 and currently plays in the AF Guarda 1° Divisão, fourth tier on Portuguese football.

Current squad

References 
https://www.ceroacero.es/equipa.php?id=3583&search=1

Association football clubs established in 1970
Football clubs in Portugal
1970 establishments in Portugal